Fothergill's sign is a medical sign.  If a mass in the abdominal wall does not cross midline and does not change with flexion of the rectus muscles, this is a positive sign for a rectus sheath hematoma.

It is named for English obstetrician William Edward Fothergill, who described features of rectus sheath hematomas in a 1926 article in the British Medical Journal entitled "Haematoma in the abdominal wall simulating pelvic new growth".

In rectus sheath haematoma, the haematoma produces a mass that does not cross the midline and remains palpable when the rectus muscle is tense.

External links

Medical signs